Raymond Geuss, FBA (born 1946) is a political philosopher and scholar of 19th and 20th century European philosophy. He is currently Emeritus Professor in the Faculty of Philosophy, University of Cambridge. Geuss is primarily known for three reasons: his early account of ideology critique in The Idea of a Critical Theory; a recent collection of works instrumental to the emergence of Political Realism in Anglophone political philosophy over the last decade, including Philosophy and Real Politics; and a variety of free-standing essays on issues including aesthetics, Nietzsche, contextualism, phenomenology, intellectual history, culture and ancient philosophy.

Life
Geuss was educated at Columbia University (undergraduate B.A., summa cum laude, 1966, and Ph.D., 1971). His Ph.D. thesis was written under the direction of Robert Denoon Cumming. Geuss was also greatly influenced by Sidney Morgenbesser during his university education.

Geuss taught at Princeton University, Columbia University, and University of Chicago in the United States, and at Heidelberg and Freiburg in Germany before taking up a lecturing post at Cambridge in 1993. In 2000 he became a naturalised British citizen. He was elected a Fellow of the British Academy in 2011.

Geuss has supervised the graduate work of several prominent scholars working in the history of continental philosophy, social and political philosophy and in the philosophy of art. His students include former Southern Poverty Law Center president J. Richard Cohen.

Work
To date, Geuss has published 16 books of philosophy, of which four are collections of essays. They are: The Idea of a Critical Theory: Habermas and the Frankfurt School; Morality, Culture, and History; Public Goods, Private Goods; History and Illusion in Politics; Glück und Politik; Outside Ethics, Philosophy and Real Politics, Politics and the Imagination, A World without Why, Reality and its Dreams, Changing the Subject: Philosophy from Socrates to Adorno, Who Needs a World View?, Not Thinking like a Liberal, and A philosopher looks at work. He has also co-edited two critical editions of works of Nietzsche, The Birth of Tragedy and Writings from the Early Notebooks. Geuss has also published two collections of translations/adaptations of poetry from Ancient Greek, Latin and Old High German texts.

Reception
Alasdair MacIntyre has written the following about Geuss:No one among contemporary moral and political philosophers writes better essays than Raymond Geuss. His prose is crisp, elegant, and lucid. His arguments are to the point. And, by inviting us to reconsider what we have hitherto taken for granted, he puts in question not just this or that particular philosophical thesis, but some of the larger projects in which we are engaged. Often enough Geuss does this with remarkable economy, provoking us into first making his questions our own and then discovering how difficult it is to answer them.

Books
 The Idea of a Critical Theory (1981)
 Morality, Culture, and History (1999)
 Parrots, Poets, Philosophers, & Good Advice (1999)
 At Cross Purposes (2001) 
 History and Illusion in Politics (2001)
 Public Goods, Private Goods (2001)
 Glück und Politik (2004)
 Outside Ethics (2005)
 Philosophy and Real Politics (2008)
 Politics and the Imagination (2010)
 A World Without Why (2014)
 Reality and its Dreams (2016)
 Changing the Subject: Philosophy from Socrates to Adorno (2017)
 Who Needs a World View? (2020)
 A philosopher looks at work (2021)
 Not thinking like a liberal (2022)

References

External links

Raymond Geuss's home page
Philosophy Bites podcast interview with Raymond Geuss on Real Politics
Philosophy Bites podcast interview with Raymond Geuss on realism and utopianism in political philosophy
Realism, Wishful Thinking, and Utopia: A talk by Raymond Geuss, May 6, 2010 at the Institute for Advanced Study, University of Minnesota 
Interview with Peter Shea, Institute for Advanced Study, University of Minnesota 
Richard Rorty at Princeton: Personal Recollections, Raymond Geuss in Arion
Interview with Four by Three magazine
Marxism lectures by Raymond Geuss, lecture 1

Living people
Academics of the University of Cambridge
English philosophers
20th-century American philosophers
21st-century American philosophers
1946 births
Naturalised citizens of the United Kingdom
American emigrants to England
People from Evansville, Indiana
Habermas scholars
Historians of political thought
Columbia College (New York) alumni
Columbia Graduate School of Arts and Sciences alumni
Columbia University faculty
Princeton University faculty
University of Chicago faculty
Academic staff of Heidelberg University
Academic staff of the University of Freiburg